Doda Lake is a freshwater body of the southern part of Eeyou Istchee James Bay (municipality), in the administrative region of Nord-du-Québec, in the province of Quebec, in Canada. Doda Lake extends into the townships of Gradis, Machault, Du Guesglin and Royal.

Forestry is the main economic activity of the sector. The latter is formed by an enlargement of the Opawica River and has a dam built at its mouth.

The Doda Lake hydrographic slope is accessible via the R1051 Forest Road from the North, then branches off to the east to serve the peninsula (extending eastward on the  separating the Father Lake and Doda Lake.

The surface of Doda Lake is generally frozen from early December November to mid-May, however safe ice movement is generally from mid-November to mid-April.

Geography

Toponymy
Father Lake and Doda Lake (area of ) appear to be two twins, having been considered as one entity by explorers. In the past, a large forest camp has been set up on its shores, where a depot has already welcomed teams of loggers and log drivers. An outfitter is operating for recreational and tourism activities including hunting and fishing.

An 1898 map identifies Father's and Doda's lakes separately. However, explorer Henry O'Sullivan considers on his 1900 map that these two lakes form a single entity that he says "Doda Sagahaigan or Father's L". Its original name Doda Sagaigan or Doda Sagandigan of Aboriginal origin of the Algonquin Nation meant "Father's Lake" or "Fathers Lake". This name has been abbreviated for ease of use and pronunciation. It could be an allusion to the ancient presence of missionaries.

The name "Lac Doda" was officialized on December 5, 1968 by the Commission de toponymie du Québec when it was created.

Notes and references

See also 

Lakes of Nord-du-Québec
Eeyou Istchee James Bay
Nottaway River drainage basin